The 2018 Northwestern State Demons football team represented Northwestern State University as a member of the Southland Conference during the 2018 NCAA Division I FCS football season. Led by first-year head coach Brad Laird, the Demons compiled an overall record of 5–6 with a mark of 4–5 in conference play, tying for eighth place in the Southland. Northwestern State played home games at Harry Turpin Stadium in Natchitoches, Louisiana.

Previous season
They finished the season 4–7, 4–5 in Southland play to finish in a tie for sixth place.

On November 17, it was announced that the contract of head coach Jay Thomas would not be renewed after the season. He finished at Northwestern State with a five-year record of 21–36.

Preseason

Preseason Poll
On July 19, 2018, the Southland announced their preseason poll, with the Demons predicted to finish in eighth place.

Schedule

Game summaries

at Texas A&M

Grambling State

at Lamar

at Southeastern Louisiana

Nicholls

Sam Houston State

at Central Arkansas

Houston Baptist

at Abilene Christian

McNeese State

at Stephen F. Austin

Roster

References

Northwestern State
Northwestern State Demons football seasons
Northwestern State Demons football